Puchaczów  is a village in Łęczna County, Lublin Voivodeship, in eastern Poland. It is the seat of the gmina (administrative district) called Gmina Puchaczów.

References

Villages in Łęczna County